Starostwo (literally "eldership")  is an administrative unit established from the 14th century in the Polish Crown and later in the Polish–Lithuanian Commonwealth until the partitions of Poland in 1795. Starostwos were established in the crown lands (królewszczyzna). The term is also used in modern Poland.

Starosta
Each starostwo was administered by an official known as starosta. The starosta would receive the office from the king and would keep it until the end of his life. It usually provided a significant income for the starosta. His deputy was variously known as podstarosta, podstarości, burgrabia, włodarz, or surrogator.

There were several types of starosta:
 Starosta Generalny was the administrative official of a specific territorial unit: either the representative of the King or Grand Duke or a person directly in charge.
 Starosta Grodowy was a county (powiat) level official responsible for fiscal duties, police and courts, and also the one responsible for the execution of judicial verdicts.
 Starosta Niegrodowy was the overseer of the Crown lands.

Powiat starosta 
When Poland regained independence in 1918 (until the beginning of the World War II in 1939) and in 1944–1950, the starosta was the head of powiat (county) administration, subordinate to the voivode.

Notes

References

Types of administrative division
Legal history of Poland
Subdivisions of Poland